The Constitution of Cúcuta, also known as Constitution of the Gran Colombia and Constitution of 1821, was the founding document and constitution of the Republic of Colombia (historiographically called Gran Colombia), unifying the territories of the Viceroyalty of New Granada as part of a federation. It was signed during the Congress of Cúcuta on August 30, 1821.

History
The Congress elected in Angostura reassembled in Cúcuta after the June 24, 1821 Battle of Carabobo, which gave independence to Venezuela. After liberating Caracas, Cartagena, Popayán and Santa Marta, on July 18, the Congress resumed efforts to draft a new Constitution to include the liberated regions. The final draft was approved on August 30, 1821, and expedited on July 12, 1822. The Constitution was structured into 10 chapters and 91 articles.

Simón Bolívar was elected President of the Republic, and Francisco de Paula Santander, Vice-President.

This is considered the first constitution of Colombia, and lasted until the dissolution of Gran Colombia in 1831.

Bibliography
Bushnell, David (1970). The Santander Regime in Gran Colombia. Westport: Greenwood Press. 
 Gibson, William Marion (1948). The Constitutions of Colombia. Durham: Duke University Press.

Gran Colombia
Constitution of Colombia
Constitutions of Venezuela
Independence of Colombia
Independence of Venezuela
Cúcuta
Simón Bolívar
Francisco de Paula Santander
1821 in Gran Colombia
1821 in Colombia
1821 in Venezuela